The Thomasville Open was a golf tournament on the PGA Tour from 1936 to 1941. It was held at the Glen Arven Country Club in Thomasville, Georgia. The purse each year was $3,000 with a winner's share of $700. From 1936 to 1938 it was a 72-hole event and from 1939 to 1941 it was a 54-hole tournament.

Winners

See also
Thomasville Open – a 1952 LPGA Tour event

References

Former PGA Tour events
Golf in Georgia (U.S. state)